There are several awards named after American photographer and environmentalist Ansel Adams.  Ansel Adams Award may refer to:

Ansel Adams Award for Conservation Photography, offered by the Sierra Club since 1971
Ansel Adams Award (The Wilderness Society), offered by The Wilderness Society since 1980